The Dili Harbor Lighthouse is a lighthouse on the shore of the Bay of Dili next to the beach on the west side of Dili, capital city of East Timor. It assists with navigation into and out of the Port of Dili.

History

The date of construction of the earlier lighthouse is not known. The studies depict a structure with a stone base, quadrangular mechanism, and an upper terrace with a cylindrical structure supporting the lamp.

Construction of the present lighthouse began in 1889, during the governorship of Rafael Jácome Lopes de Andrade (1888–1890).  In that year, the masonry base was completed. Maps published in 1892 and 1893 document both lighthouses simultaneously.

The present lighthouse was completed in 1896, and has twice been reconstructed and improved: in 1932, and between 1948 and 1949 after the Japanese occupation of Portuguese Timor.  The latter refurbishments included the landscaping of the lighthouse's platform.

In the early 1950s, the adjacent area, informally named "Bairro do Farol", was developed in accordance with the 1951 General Urban Plan of Díli, as a residential area for high level colonial public servants and Europeans.

Architecture and fittings
Currently, the lighthouse consists of a  octagonal metal skeletal tower rising from a massive masonry base, with a lantern and gallery at its peak.  Access to the lantern is by an exposed stairway spiralling around a central column.

See also
 List of lighthouses in East Timor

References

External links 

Buildings and structures in Dili
Lighthouses completed in 1896
Lighthouses in Southeast Asia
1896 establishments in Portuguese Timor